The 1995 Fordham Rams football team was an American football team that represented Fordham University during the 1995 NCAA Division I-AA football season. Fordham finished fourth in the Patriot League. 

In their second year under head coach Nick Quartaro, the Rams compiled a 4–6–1 record. Jim Ciarlante, Joe Moorhead, Steve Borys, Chris O'Leary and Won Kyu Rim were the team captains.

The Rams were outscored 236 to 208. Their 2–3 conference record placed last in the six-team Patriot League standings. 

Fordham played its home games at Jack Coffey Field on the university campus in The Bronx, in New York City.

Schedule

References

Fordham
Fordham Rams football seasons
Fordham Rams football